The Undershepherd is a 2012 American drama film written and directed by Russ Parr and starring Isaiah Washington.

Two preacher friends clash as one is led by God and the other is led by Satan.

Cast
Isaiah Washington as L.C.
Bill Cobbs as Dr. Ezekiel Cannon
Lamman Rucker as Roland
Robinne Lee as Shirley
Malinda Williams as Casandra
Keith David as Brother Wilks
Elise Neal as Sister Roberts
Louis Gossett Jr. as Bishop Redford

Accolades
The film won accolades for Best Narrative Feature, Best Director (Parr) and Best Performance by an Actor (Williams) at the 16th American Black Film Festival.

References

External links
 
 

2012 films
American drama films
2010s English-language films
2010s American films